The 1948 Michigan gubernatorial election was held on November 2, 1948. Democratic nominee G. Mennen Williams defeated incumbent Republican Kim Sigler with 53.41% of the vote.

General election

Candidates
Major party candidates
G. Mennen Williams, Democratic
Kim Sigler, Republican
Other candidates
Seth A. Davey, Prohibition
Emanuel Seidler, Socialist
Arthur Chenoweth, Socialist Labor
Howard Lerner, Socialist Workers

Results

Primaries
The primary elections occurred on September 14, 1948.

Democratic primary

Republican primary

References

1948
Michigan
Gubernatorial
November 1948 events in the United States